The Mount Airy News is a six-day-a-week newspaper published in Mount Airy, North Carolina, United States.  It was established in 1880. The News has a circulation of 9,263 according to The Park Library's list of North Carolina newspapers.  It is one of several newspapers serving Surry County, along with The Tribune in Elkin and The Pilot of Pilot Mountain.

History
The News, The Tribune, and The Pilot all have the same corporate parent.  In June 2007, both The News and The Tribune were part of a sale from Mid-South Management Co., Inc. to Heartland Publications, LLC of Connecticut.

Mount Airy had two newspapers until around 1980, when the weekly Mount Airy Times was bought by the News.  In 2007, the city again had two papers with The Messenger and The Mount Airy News. However, after attempting several different publication schedules, The Messenger closed less than three years later, shutting its doors in 2010.

The Mount Airy News was published seven days a week. On April 9, 2012, The News ceased publication of its Monday edition. The paper now publishes Tuesday through Sunday.

In 2012 Versa Capital Management merged Heartland Publications, Ohio Community Media, the former Freedom papers it had acquired, and Impressions Media into a new company, Civitas Media. Civitas Media sold its properties in the Carolinas to Champion Media in 2017. Later in 2017, Champion Media sold its Mount Airy area newspapers to Adams Publishing Group.

See also
 List of newspapers in North Carolina

External links 

 The Mount Airy News current homepage
 The Mount Airy News issues from 1917-1929

References 

Daily newspapers published in North Carolina
Surry County, North Carolina